William Salesbury also Salusbury (c. 1520 – c. 1584) was the leading Welsh scholar of the Renaissance and the principal translator of the 1567 Welsh New Testament.

Early life 
Salesbury was born some time before 1520 (possibly as early as 1507) in the parish of Llansannan, Conwy. He was the second son of Ffwg Salesbury (d. 1520) and Annes, daughter of Wiliam ap Gruffydd ap Robin o Gochwillan. By 1540 he had moved to Plas Isa, Llanrwst; this had been the residence of both his father and his brother. He was probably educated locally, and was certainly influenced by the literary traditions of the Vale of Clwyd. He then studied at Oxford University, probably living in Broadgates Hall. Here he studied the Hebrew, Greek and Latin languages, and became familiar with the (banned) writings of Martin Luther and William Tyndale as well as the technology of printing. Here too he was caught up in the renaissance of learning. Mathias suggests that it was at Oxford that Salesbury left the Roman Catholic church and became a Protestant. Although there is no record of his either having taken a degree at Oxford or having gone on to one of the inns of court, it is known that in 1550 he was at Thavies Inn. Although he spent considerable time in London, there is no evidence of his having travelled abroad. His wife was Catrin Llwyd, sister of Ellis Price. She died around 1572.

Career
Brinley Jones describes the remarkable range of Salesbury's writings, "the product of a Renaissance humanist scholar, lexicographer, and translator". Mathias describes his motivations as making the Bible available to the Welsh people, and imparting knowledge to them in their own language. In 1547, Salesbury produced an English-Welsh dictionary called A dictionary in Englyshe and Welshe, printed by John Waley 'at London in Foster Lane' in 1547. Mathias conjectures that this may have been the first book to be printed in Welsh. Brinley Jones suggests that the dictionary has the appearance of a work-book, devised in the first place for Salesbury's own use. In 1550 his A  and a  introduction,  how to pronounce the letters in the British tong (now commonly called Walsh)... was printed by Robert Crowley. A short comparative study of Welsh sounds with Hebrew and Greek is included, plus an examination of the Latin element in Welsh (which he had first examined in the dictionary of 1547). Both of these books have become important sources for information about the spoken English of the sixteenth century. One of Salesbury's books of 1550, The Descripcion of the Sphere or Frame of the Worlde, has been described as the first science book in the English language.

Salesbury also published books in Welsh at the same time. In 1547 he published a collection of 930 Welsh proverbs made by Gruffudd Hiraethog (d. 1564), .

In 1550, he published . This book, printed by Robert Crowley, was in Welsh and English; as the title indicates, it was an attempt to justify Protestant doctrine in favour of a clerical marriage to the Welsh and English by establishing precedent for it in the " law" of a Welsh king. (It was no doubt significant that the present royal family, the Tudors, had Welsh origins.) Also in 1550, a polemical text appeared under Crowley's imprint stating that it was "compiled" by Salesbury: The  of the Popes Botereulx, commonly called the high . In this work, he took part in one the great controversies of the time, considering the doctrine of the sacrifice of the mass as show in the existence of stone altars in churches. A third Salesbury book with Crowley's imprint in 1551 is a translation of the epistle and gospel readings from the 1549 Book of Common Prayer: . Brinley Jones describes this as his first major contribution towards presenting the scriptures in Welsh.

As a convinced Protestant, Salesbury was obliged to spend most of the reign of Mary I, 1553–1558, in hiding and probably back in Llanrwst. As a consequence his writing and publishing came to a stop.

The belief of Erasmus and Luther that the Bible should be available to all in their native language was firmly advocated by Salesbury. He wrote 'Insist on having Holy Scripture in your language'. With the succession of Elizabeth I, Salesbury went to work on this project. In 1563, an act of parliament ordered the bishops of Wales and Hereford to see that a Welsh translation of the Bible, Book of Common Prayer and administration of the sacraments be ready by 1 March 1567. Quite possibly a confederate in this project, Robert Crowley, Salesbury's former printer, was at this time a Canon of Hereford, having been instituted to the stall or prebend of "Pratum majus" in the cathedral of Hereford c. 1560–63.

Salesbury worked with Richard Davies, Bishop of St. David's, (1 Timothy, Hebrews, James, 1 and 2 Peter) and Thomas Huet, Precentor of St David's, (Revelation) to prepare a translation of the New Testament from the original Greek into Welsh. Salesbury was responsible for a large part of the translation therefore, as well as being editor. This was published on 7 October 1567. As Mathias points out, Salesbury's translations were heavily criticised for being full of Latinisms and other orthographical peculiarities and consequently unintelligible to many of his contemporaries. However, Mathias is still able to describe them as fine translations, both as regards language and style. Moreover, Bishop William Morgan was to virtually adopt Salesbury's version of the New Testament into his Bible of 1588. Sir John Wynn of Gwydir believed that Richard Davies and Salesbury were also collaborating on a translation of the Old Testament but disagreed over the use of one word. Whatever the truth of this, work on the Old Testament did not proceed.

Like the Welsh New Testament, this was published by Humphrey Toy.

Salesbury's last recorded work,  ('Herbal'), was basically a paraphrase of some of the best-known herbals of the time, particularly Leonhard Fuchs's De historia stirpium. William Turner's A New Herball was another source. Most of the entries follow the same pattern—the name(s) in Latin, English, Welsh, a description, where the herbs are found, when they appear, and what properties they possess.

Death and legacy
It is likely that Salesbury died around 1580; the place of his burial is unknown. Brinley Jones considers him the outstanding example of the Welsh Renaissance scholar, broad in his range and interests, inquisitive and enquiring. Mathias concludes that it would be hard to find anybody who has rendered greater service to the Welsh nation than William Salesbury. His translation of the scriptures into Welsh laid the foundations of modern Welsh prose.

See also
Welsh Bible

References

Further reading
Andrew Breeze, "William Salesbury," The Dictionary of Literary Biography, Volume 281: British Rhetoricians and Logicians, 1500–1660, Second Series, Detroit: Gale, 2003, pp. 260–273.
R. Brinley Jones, "Geirfa Rhethreg 1552–1632," Ysgrifau Beirniadol, vol. 9, 1976, 118–146. 
James Pierce, "A Rare Scholar: The Life and Work of William Salesbury." Y Lolfa, 2016.
Isaac Thomas, "William Salesbury and his Testament", Cardiff : University of Wales Press, 1967 / Isaac Thomas, "William Salesbury a'i Destament", Caerdydd : Gwasg Prifysgol Cymru, 1967.
W. Alun Mathias, "Llyfr Rhetoreg William Salesbury," Llen Cymru, vol. 1, 1951, pp. 259–268, and vol. 2, 1952, pp. 71–81.

Citations  

1520s births
1580s deaths
Translators of the Bible into Welsh
History of Christianity in Wales
People from Denbighshire
Welsh non-fiction writers
Welsh translators
Welsh scholars and academics
Welsh language
Alumni of the University of Oxford
Welsh lexicographers
16th-century scholars
16th-century translators
16th-century Welsh writers
16th-century male writers
People from Llansannan
William
16th-century Anglican theologians